Racha, also spelt Rachcha, is a 2012 Indian Telugu-language masala film directed by Sampath Nandi and co-written by the Paruchuri Brothers. Produced by R. B. Choudary in association with N. V. Prasad and Paras Jain under their banner Megaa Super Good Films, it stars Ram Charan and Tamannaah, with Mukesh Rishi, Dev Gill and Kota Srinivasa Rao. The film marks the Telugu debut of Ajmal Ameer and R. Parthiepan who makes a cameo appearance.

The film was edited by Gautham Raju; Sameer Reddy provided the cinematography; Mani Sharma composed the film's score and soundtrack. Principal photography commenced in June 2011 and was shot in various locations throughout Asia, mainly in Telangana, Andhra Pradesh, Tamil Nadu of India apart from Sri Lanka and Bangkok. It was also shot in the Anji County of China making it the first Telugu film to do so.

The film was released worldwide on 5 April 2012. The film received four nominations at the 60th Filmfare Awards South where it won the award for best choreography. It also received five nominations at 2nd South Indian International Movie Awards but did not win any.

Plot 
Raj is a Hyderabad-based gambler living with his adopted parents who support his means of living. Tragedy strikes the family when his adopted father is diagnosed with cirrhosis as a result of alcoholism. Raj needs 20 lakhs for his father's liver transplantation, which must be done within a month. As he is on the lookout for money, he is approached by James, his rival in betting, with a betting challenge. James dares Raj to make Chaitra, a dental student and the daughter of a dreaded and influential businessman Bellary, fall in love with him. If he is able to complete the task before 31 December 2011, James will give him the money needed for his father's operation; if not, he has to give up betting forever. Desperate for the money, Raj takes up the challenge and begins wooing Chaitra. Chaitra soon reciprocates his advances. Bellary finds out about their relationship and sends his henchmen to kill the couple on the night of 31 December. Raj and Chaitra successfully dodge the henchmen and escape to Srisailam. Bellary, with the help of his corrupt minister-friend Baireddanna and the latter's Dubai-based son, begins a search for them. At Srisailam, James rescues the couple from Bellary's henchmen but gets stabbed by Baireddanna's son who also kidnaps Chaitra. An injured James reveals that he was sent by his father to protect them and reveals about Raj's past.

Raj's father Suryanarayana was a respected man in Rayadurga and his best friend, a rich man named Raghupathy was Chaitra's father. Chaitra and Raj were childhood friends. Bellary, who is Raghypathy's brother-in-law, found out about the presence of iron ore under Raghupathy's land, and along with Baireddanna, decided to exploit the ore for their own benefit. When Suryanarayana and Raghupathy objected, they and their families, except Raj and Chaitra, were killed by Bellary and Baireddanna. Chaitra was adopted by Bellary, who planned to kill her when she becomes an adult so he could acquire Raghupathy's land. James's father (Bellary's PA) had revealed her past to Chitra, who decide to avenge her father's death had learnt about Raj and his love for making bets from James. She and James's father tells him to trap Raj by placing the bet so that Bellary and Baireddanna can be destroyed using him. Raj decides to avenge his father's death and kills Bellary, Baireddanna and his son at Rayadurg. He rescues Chaitra (who would have died if not rescued in 10 minutes) and they distributes Raghupathy's and Suryanarayana's land to the villagers

Cast 

Ram Charan as Raj
Tamannaah as Chaitra "Ammu"
Ajmal Ameer as James
Mukesh Rishi as Ballari 
Dev Gill as Baireddy's son
Kota Srinivasa Rao as Baireddy 
Nassar as Raghupathi, Chaitra's father
R. Parthiban as Suryanarayana, Raj's father
Brahmanandam as Dr. Rangeela
Ali as Papa Rao
Diksha Panth as Basanthi, Papa Rao's girlfriend
Paruchuri Venkateswara Rao as James's father
Jaya Prakash Reddy as Sub-inspector J. P. D. Souza
Geetha as Bellary's wife
Venu Madhav as Raj's friend
Srinivasa Reddy as Raj's friend
Thagubothu Ramesh as Bobby, Raj's friend
M. S. Narayana as Raj's adoptive father
Sudha as Raj's adoptive mother 
Ravi Babu as Chaitra's bodyguard
Mukhtar Khan as Police Officer 
Dharmavarapu Subramanyam as Raj's uncle
Krishna Bhagavaan as KP
Fish Venkat as Venkat 
Jhansi as Slum Member
Chatrapathi Sekhar as Villager
Duvvasi Mohan as Waiter
Uttej
L. B. Sriram as Villager
Shriya Sharma as Chaitra's sister
Geetha Singh as KP's sister
Pragathi as Raj's biological mother
Hema as Raj's aunt
Satya Krishnan as Slum Member 
Vennela Kishore as Raj's friend
Junior Relangi as Religious Man
Lisa Haydon in a special appearance in the film's title song

Production

Development 
R. B. Choudary, in association with N. V. Prasad and Paras Jain, produced a film titled Merupu directed by Dharani starring Ram Charan and Kajal Aggarwal whose production began on 30 April 2010. There was no proper script except a vague one-line for the film then and a song was shot on Charan. After the release of Orange (2010), Charan and the producers asked Dharani to come up with its bound script. He narrated it to both Charan and his father Chiranjeevi. When Dharani quoted a high budget, Chiranjeevi and the producers suggested a reduction.

After completing a schedule, Merupu was shelved and later, N. V. Prasad approved a script narrated by Sampath Nandi and announced in late February 2011. The film's official launch ceremony was conducted on 12 June 2011 at Ramanaidu Studios in Hyderabad where the film's working title was announced as Racha. Mani Sharma was signed to compose the film's music. Sameer Reddy was recruited as the film's cinematographer while Raju Sundaram and Shobi choreographed the songs along with Prem Rakshith. The film's Telugu logo was unveiled on 14 February 2012 and the title was confirmed as Racha where the first two letters were taken from Ram and the other three letters were taken from Charan. The first look poster featuring Charan was unveiled on 18 February 2012.

Casting 
Charan left for an abroad trip for a complete make-over of his attire and practised different dancing steps as part of his homework for the film. He also underwent training in strict physical exercise for about 45 days in David Barton's gym. Reports in early March 2011 suggested that Tamannaah would be signed in as the female lead, who was finalised for the same in mid May 2011. She was confirmed to play the role of a rich woman who falls in love with a poor man. She later revealed in an interview that her character is integral to the film's main plot and its layers get revealed as the film progresses.

R. Parthiepan made a cameo appearance as Charan's father in the film marking his Telugu debut who accepted it after Nandi explained the role's importance. Ajmal Ameer's inclusion in the film's cast was confirmed in late July 2011. He revealed later that every character in the film would be introduced through his role which would be a cameo appearance, adding that it would be an impactful one bringing twists in the story. He could not dub for his role since he was shooting for a Tamil film in France. Brahmanandam and Krishna Bhagavaan were included in the film's cast in early October 2011. Dev Gill was signed to play one of the antagonists. He revealed that all his action sequences will be with Charan only. Lisa Haydon performed an item number in the film.

Filming 
Principal photography commenced in June 2011 at Hyderabad. The next schedule began at Sri Lanka in early July 2011. Tamannaah joined the film's sets on 7 July 2011 and she revealed that the film would be shot in the jungles of Sri Lanka in a long schedule. A song featuring Charan and Tamannaah was shot in Sri Lanka in late July 2011 on whose completion the schedule was wrapped up. Filming continued at Bangkok till 15 August 2011. Later, a dance academy set was erected in the outskirts of Hyderabad where few comedy scenes were shot.

Few scenes were shot in a set erected near the Aluminium factory at Gachibowli. Tamannaah and Brahmanandam participated in the film's shoot at Hyderabad till 6 October 2011 after which the makers planned to shoot the film in China. After much silent shoot in Hyderabad, filming continued at Goa. During the shoot of Charan's introduction scene, the cables fixed to the train failed and Charan, who was sitting in a car on the railway track, jumped from the car and was injured. After the schedule's completion, Charan visited Sabarimala to end his Aiyyappa Deeksha.

The song Vaana Vaana Velluvaye was shot on Charan and Tamannaah in early November 2011. A special set in Annapurna Studios was erected where the song was shot for four days after which the film's China schedule commenced from 12 November 2011. A song and a fight sequence was shot at a Bamboo forest in Anji County of Zhejiang province till the end of November 2011. Racha became the first Telugu film to be shot in the dense forest of interior China. On its completion, Charan took a break for ten days. The film's shoot resumed at Rayalacheruvu near Tirupathi in December 2011. After a brief shoot at Ramoji Film City, the last schedule began in Chennai on 17 January 2012. The shooting of the title song choreographed by Prem Rakshith was wrapped up at Buddha Statue of Hyderabad on 23 January 2012.

The film's shoot continued at Periyar National Park of Kerala in February 2012. Charan and Tamannaah were filming for a song sequence on a boat when the park's deputy director Sanjay Kumar insisted that the duo should use life jackets as they were entering a risky spot. After few disagreements, the film's shoot was temporarily halted and some long shots were shot when the duo used the jackets. The forest officials also restricted the entry of about 20 vehicles and 100 members into the park due to which the shoot was limited to a small portion of a song.

After spraining his leg during the song shoot at Annapurna Studios, Charan was advised to take a bed rest for three to four weeks. He rejoined the shoot on 25 March 2012 to complete the remaining two songs. After completing the shoot for the song Dillaku Dillaku at Annapurna Studios in Hyderabad, the last song Singarenundi was shot at Anaimalai Hills and Siruvani Waterfalls near Pollachi on Charan and Tamannaah. On its completion, the film's team returned to Hyderabad and the principal photography came to an end on 1 April 2012.

Music 

Mani Sharma composed the film's soundtrack and background score. The soundtrack consists of 5 songs. The song Vaana Vaana Velluvaye from the film Gang Leader was remixed for this film. Aditya Music and Star Music marketed the soundtrack albums of the Telugu and Tamil versions respectively. The soundtrack was released by hosting a promotional event at People's Plaza near Necklace road on 20 February 2012.

Release  
The film was initially scheduled for a release in March 2012. After Charan suffered a muscle tear in his leg, the film's shoot was delayed due to which the film's release was postponed to 5 April 2012. The film's Tamil dubbed version titled Ragalai was announced in mid March 2012 after the release of Maaveeran. Racha was awarded an 'U/A' certificate by Central Board of Film Certification on 3 April 2012.

After Competition Commission of India imposed a fine on Karnataka Film Chamber of Commerce for restricting free trade, Racha released in Karnataka in more than 120 screens. Ragalai was released on 6 April 2012. The Malayalam dubbed version Raksha released on 13 April 2012 though it was planned for a simultaneous release with Ragalai. Racha Television broadcasting rights were sold to Gemini TV. Both the Indian and overseas DVDs and Blu-rays of the Telugu version were marketed by Aditya Videos.

Racha was dubbed into Tamil as Ragalai and into Malayalam as Raksha. The former was released on 6 April 2012 while the latter was released a week later. The film was dubbed into Hindi as Betting Raja in 2014 and this film was remade in Bangladesh as Honeymoon starring Bappy Chowdhury and Mahiya Mahi.

Reception

Critical reception 
Sify called the film a "paisa vasool" one and stated "Both, actor Ram Charan and his director Sampath Nandi play a safe game by following the same pattern of earlier mass-masala movies. Rachcha offers nothing new but has enough elements that entertain the mass audiences and mega fans." Sangeetha Devi Dundoo of The Hindu stated "Within the framework of pleasing the actor's fan clubs, the film works. But the sense of déjà vu in the tale of revenge is palpable. Even when you tune yourself into watching a mass entertainer and don't expect anything intellectually stimulating, you do miss the ingenuity and spark that were the hallmark of mass entertainer blockbusters like Singam, Pokiri or Kick. Go without expectations and you will be entertained."

Karthik Pasupulate of The Times of India gave the film 3 out of 5 stars and felt that the film is designed for the "hardcore Mega Fans and it makes no bones about it". He added "Clearly there are a lot of prospective hooting opportunities for the die hard Ram Charan fans. As for the other kind of audience, well, you'll have to ask them. We suspect they might just be feeling a little unattended". Praising the screenplay written by Sampath Nandi, Ramchander of Oneindia Entertainment stated "Finally, Sampath Nandi has come out with a good film. Though, the story is not that great and is quite predictable one, the ability of the director made it quite interesting."

Rating the film 2.5 out of 5 stars, CNN-IBN felt that the film was technically brilliant but lacked a credible storyline. They termed the film's presentation as a "lacklustre and ordinary" one. Radhika Rajamani of Rediff.com gave 2 out of 5 stars and criticised the film for its predictability and stereotypical pattern and stated that Racha is a potboiler meant for the masses and not for a discerning audience. Praising the lead pair's performances by calling them as one of the reasons to watch this film, IndiaGlitz opined that at the end, Racha means "telling an old story with lot's [sic] of bells and whistles — over the top dialogues, destructive fights, falling back on the poor, etc."

Box office 
Racha debuted with an average occupancy of 90% and collected  at the AP/Nizam box office setting first day record. By late April 2012, the film collected  nett in Karnataka.

The film completed a 50-day run in 127 direct centres across the AP/Nizam region out of which 38 screens were from Ceded region and 16 screens were from Nizam region. By then, the film was declared a blockbuster. The film completed a 100-day run in 38 centres across Andhra Pradesh on 13 July 2012. Rachas final share for its distributors was

Awards and nominations

In popular culture 
The specially designed axe used by Ram Charan in the film's climax was auctioned by Movie Artist Association. In a press meet, Tammanaah showcased the axe to the media and the proceeds of its sale were announced to be used to educate poor children in Telugu cinema. In Aagadu (2014), Brahmanandam performed a spoof on this film along with two other 2014 Telugu films Legend and Race Gurram.

References

External links 

2012 films
2010s Telugu-language films
Indian action films
2012 action films
2012 masala films
Films shot in Sri Lanka
Films shot in Bangkok
Films shot in China
Films shot in Andhra Pradesh
Films shot in Tamil Nadu
Films shot in Kerala
Films shot in Munnar
Films shot in Goa
Films scored by Mani Sharma
Films shot in Hyderabad, India
Super Good Films films